Klonowa  is a village in Sieradz County, Łódź Voivodeship, in central Poland. It is the seat of the gmina (administrative district) called Gmina Klonowa.

The village has a population of 950.

References

Villages in Sieradz County